Weidong is a Chinese ferry company operating international ferries between the Chinese province of Shandong and the South Korean port city of Incheon (near Seoul)

Operations
Weidong operate 4 vessels: 
 New Golden Bridge II (passenger & vehicle)
 New Golden Bridge V (passenger & vehicle)
 Sinokor Pyongtaek (container)
 MV Kalimanis (container)

Passenger Operations

New Golden Bridge II
The New Golden Bridge II operates three weekly services between Weihai and Incheon, departing Weihai at 19:00 on Sunday, Tuesday & Thursday, arriving into Incheon at 11:00 the next day. The return service departs Incheon at 19:00 on Monday, Wednesday and Saturday, arriving into Weihai at 09:00 the next day.
The New Golden Bridge II has a gross weight of 27,000 MT. It has accommodation for 731 passengers over five classes and a Ro-Ro cargo capacity of 295 TEU.

New Golden Bridge V
The New Golden Bridge V operates three weekly services between Qingdao and Incheon, departing Qingdao at 17:00 on Monday, Wednesday & Friday, arriving into Incheon at 11:00 the next day. The return service departs Incheon at 17:00 on Tuesday, Thursday and Saturday, arriving into Qingdao at 09:00 the next day.
The New Golden Bridge V has a gross weight of 30,000 MT. It has accommodation for 660 passengers over four classes and a Ro-Ro cargo capacity of 325 TEU.

Cargo Operations
Weidong operate 2 cargo only ships that do not routinely carry fare paying passengers

Sinokor Pyongtaek
Sinokor Pyongtaek operates twice weekly between Weihai and Incheon, departing Weihai at 18:00 on Sunday and Wednesday, arriving into Incheon at 11:00 the next day. The return service departs Incheon at 19:00 on Tuesday and 21:00 on Thursday, arriving into Weihai at 08:00 on Wednesday and 10:00 on Friday.

MV Kalimanis
MV Kalimanis operates twice weekly between Qingdao and Incheon, departing Qingdao at 18:00 on Wednesday & Saturday, arriving into Incheon at 19:00 the next day. The return service departs Incheon at 08:00 on Tuesday and Friday, arriving into Qingdao at 07:00 the next day.

References

External links
website

Ferries of China
Ferries of South Korea
Transport in Shandong
Transport in Incheon